Liberation is the collective name of four TrueType font families: Liberation Sans, Liberation Sans Narrow, Liberation Serif, and Liberation Mono. These fonts are metrically compatible with the most popular fonts on the Microsoft Windows operating system and the Microsoft Office software package (Monotype Corporation’s Arial, Arial Narrow, Times New Roman and Courier New, respectively), for which Liberation is intended as a free substitute. The fonts are default in LibreOffice.

Characteristics
Liberation Sans, Liberation Sans Narrow, and Liberation Serif closely match the metrics of Monotype Corporation fonts Arial, Arial Narrow, and Times New Roman, respectively. This means that the letters and symbols width and height between the Liberation fonts and the corresponding Monotype fonts are identical, and the Monotype fonts can be substituted by the corresponding Liberation font without changing the document layout.

Liberation Mono is styled closer to Liberation Sans than Monotype’s Courier New, though its metrics match with Courier New.

The Liberation fonts are intended as free, open-source replacements of the aforementioned proprietary fonts.

Unicode coverage 
All three fonts supported IBM/Microsoft code pages 437, 737, 775, 850, 852, 855, 857, 858, 860, 861, 863, 865, 866, 869, 1250, 1251, 1252, 1253, 1254, 1257, the Macintosh Character Set (US Roman), and the Windows OEM character set, that is, the Latin, Greek, and Cyrillic alphabets, leaving out many writing systems. Extension to other writing systems was prevented by its unique licensing terms.  Since the old fonts were replaced by the Croscore equivalents, expanded Unicode coverage has become possible.

History
The fonts were developed by Steve Matteson of Ascender Corporation as Ascender Sans and Ascender Serif.  A variant of this font family, with the addition of a monospaced font and open-source license, was licensed by Red Hat Inc. as the Liberation font family. Liberation Sans and Liberation Serif derive from Ascender Sans and Ascender Serif respectively; Liberation Mono uses base designs from Ascender Sans and Ascender Uni Duo.

The fonts were developed in two stages. The first release of May 2007 was a set of fully usable fonts, but they lacked the full hinting capability. The second release, made available in the beginning of 2008, provides full hinting of the fonts.

In April 2010, Oracle Corporation contributed the Liberation Sans Narrow typefaces to the project. They are metrically compatible with the popular Arial Narrow font family. With Liberation Fonts 1.06 the new typefaces were officially released.

Distribution

Version 2.00.0 or above
As of December 2018, Liberation Fonts 2.00.0 and above are a fork of the ChromeOS Fonts released under the SIL Open Font License, and all fonts are developed at GitHub.

Older versions
Red Hat licensed these fonts from Ascender Corp under the GNU General Public License with a font embedding exception, which states that documents embedding these fonts do not automatically fall under the GNU GPL. As a further exception, any distribution of the object code of the Software in a physical product must provide the right to access and modify the source code for the Software and to reinstall that modified version of the Software in object code form on the same physical product on which it was received. Thus, these fonts permit free and open-source software (FOSS) systems to have high-quality fonts that are metric-compatible with Microsoft software.

The Fedora Project, as of version 9, was the first major Linux distribution to include these fonts by default and features a slightly revised versions of the Liberation fonts contributed by Ascender. These include a dotted zero and various changes made for the benefit of internationalization.

Some other Linux distributions (such as Ubuntu, OpenSUSE and Mandriva Linux) included Liberation fonts in their default installations. The open source software LibreOffice, OpenOffice.org and Collabora Online included Liberation fonts in their installation packages for all supported operating systems.

Due to licensing concerns with fonts released under a GPL license, some projects looked for alternatives to the Liberation fonts.  Starting with Apache OpenOffice 3.4, Liberation Fonts were replaced with the ChromeOS Fonts – also known as Croscore fonts: Arimo (sans), Cousine (monospace), and Tinos (serif) – which are made available by Ascender Corporation under the Apache License 2.0.

Unsupported features

Unlike modern versions of Times New Roman, Arial, and Courier New, Liberation fonts do not support OpenType advanced typography features like ligatures, old style numerals, or fractions.

See also

Typefaces

 Croscore fonts – fonts which formed the basis for Liberation fonts
 Droid – a font family by the same font designer
 Gentium – an Open Font License font which defines roughly 1,500 glyphs covering almost all the range of Latin characters used worldwide
 Linux Libertine – another free software serif typeface with OpenType features support
 Nimbus Roman No. 9 L, Nimbus Sans L and Nimbus Mono L – another series of free software fonts also designed to be substituted for Times New Roman, Arial and Courier.
 GNU FreeFont, derived from Nimbus, but with a better Unicode support.

Other

 Open-source Unicode typefaces

References

External links

  at github.com
 Liberation font files at the releases page
 Liberation Sans Narrow files at the releases page
 .

Unified serif and sans-serif typeface families
Free software Unicode typefaces
Typefaces and fonts introduced in 2007